Fu Pak (富柏) is one of the 20 constituencies in the Yau Tsim Mong District.

The constituency returns one district councillor to the Yau Tsim Mong District Council, with an election every four years. The seat is formerly held by Yu Tak-po of the Civic Party.

Fu Pak constituency is loosely based on the areas of the Hoi Fu Court, Park Avenue, Central Park and The Hermitage on the reclaimed land of old Yau Ma Tei Typhoon Shelter. with estimated population of 19,594.

Councillors represented

Election results

2010s

2000s

References

Yau Ma Tei
Tai Kok Tsui
Olympian City
Constituencies of Hong Kong
Constituencies of Yau Tsim Mong District Council
2003 establishments in Hong Kong
Constituencies established in 2003